Sveti Urh may refer to several places in Slovenia: 

Ravenska Vas, a settlement in the Municipality of Zagorje ob Savi, known as Sveti Urh until 1955
Urh, Slovenska Bistrica, a settlement in the Municipality of Slovenska Bistrica, known as Sveti Urh until 1952